George & James is an album released by American art rock group the Residents in 1984, subtitled American Composer Series – Volume 1. Side one of the album consists of George Gershwin covers, while side two is a studio rendition of James Brown's 1963 album Live at the Apollo.

The American Composer Series was meant to be an ongoing project, lasting from 1984 until 2000, with the intent to pay homage to different composers and songwriters from the United States. After a second album, Stars and Hank Forever (released in 1986), the project was cancelled following unenthusiastic reviews and high licensing costs, as well as the advent of CD technology, hindering the concept of split albums. The group has mentioned abandoned plans to cover music by Harry Partch, Harry Nilsson, Barry White, Bob Dylan, Sun Ra and Ray Charles, among others.

Track listing

Bonus track on UK cassette release 
 "It's a Man's Man's Man's World" – 3:42

Personnel 
 The Residents – performance
 Raoul N. Di Seimbote – portrayal of the Famous Flames

References 

The Residents albums
1984 albums
Recordings of music by George Gershwin
James Brown
Cultural depictions of James Brown
Ralph Records albums